This is a list of U.S. states and the District of Columbia by immigrant population.

Immigrant population is defined as "foreign-born," which means "anyone who is not a U.S. citizen at birth."

Foreign born population

See also 
 List of sovereign states and dependent territories by immigrant population

References 

immigrant population
immigrant population
Ranked lists of country subdivisions
United States demography-related lists